Helix is a Canadian hard rock band from Kitchener, Ontario. Formed in 1974, the group originally featured lead vocalist Brian Vollmer, guitarists Ron Watson and Rick "Minstrel" Trembley, bassist Keith "Bert" Zurbrigg, and drummer Bruce Arnold. By the time they recorded their debut album Breaking Loose in 1979, Vollmer and Zurbrigg were joined by guitarists Brent Doerner and Paul Hackman, and drummer Brian Doerner. The band's current lineup includes Vollmer alongside drummer Greg "Fritz" Hinz (from 1981 to 1996, and since 2009), bassist Daryl Gray (from 1984 to 2002, and since 2009), and guitarists Gary Borden (from 1996 to 1998, and since 2019) and Chris Julke (since 2014).

History

1974–1989
Helix was formed in 1974 by Brian Vollmer, Ron Watson, Rick Trembley, Keith Zurbrigg, Bruce Arnold and Don Simmons. The group was initially known as the Helix Field Band, before they brought in manager Bill Seip who encouraged the members to shorten the name. Around the same time as Seip's arrival, roughly six months after the group formed, Trembley was fired by band leaders Arnold and Watson and was not replaced. Watson left shortly thereafter, replaced by Brent "The Doctor" Doerner. Helix began touring Canadian bars after Seip took over management, although early on both Arnold and Simmons left the band. The pair were replaced by Doerner's brother Brian and Paul Hackman, respectively. This lineup recorded and released the band's debut album Breaking Loose in 1979.

After touring in promotion of Breaking Loose, Brian Doerner was replaced by Leo Niebudek; after recording one track for White Lace & Black Leather, Zurbrigg was also replaced by Mike Uzelac. In 1982, Niebudek was replaced by former Starchild drummer Greg "Fritz" Hinz, who debuted on No Rest for the Wicked. Just before a US tour to promote the album, bassist Uzelac became a born again Christian and left the band, replaced by touring member Pete Guy. Uzelac briefly returned later in the summer, before Mark Rector took over until the end of the year, starting with a European tour supporting Kiss. Daryl Gray took over as full-time bassist at the beginning of 1984 to record Walkin' the Razor's Edge. This lineup also released Long Way to Heaven in 1985 and Wild in the Streets in 1987.

1989–2002
After the touring cycle for Wild in the Streets, guitarist Brent Doerner departed from Helix in 1989. The remaining four members recorded Back for Another Taste without a second guitarist. For the album's tour starting the following summer, the group was joined by its first American member, guitarist Denny Balicki (later Blake). On July 5, 1992, when the band was travelling back to Kitchener after a short local tour, a bus carrying Paul Hackman, Daryl Gray and two of Helix's road crew members crashed near the city of Kamloops, killing Hackman on impact. Despite this tragedy, Helix continued later in the year, with Brent Doerner returning and Greg "Shredder" Fraser taking over from Hackman. The new lineup released It's a Business Doing Pleasure on Aquarius Records in 1993.

Following the release of the album, Doerner left again and Helix toured with rotating part-time touring guitarists alongside Fraser, including Gary Borden, Rick Mead and Mark Chichkan. When Fraser left in 1996, Borden took over as his official replacement; when drummer Greg Hinz left later the same year, Glen "Archie" Gamble took his place. During this flexible period, the band recorded the bulk of the material for 1998's Half-Alive, which also included a handful of tracks recorded with Hackman before his death. By 2000, Helix had returned to a more regular touring schedule and settled on a lineup of Vollmer, Gray and Gamble alongside guitarists Gerry Finn and Mike Hall. In 2001, Harem Scarem drummer Darren Smith took over from Gerry Finn, who left to join David Usher's band.

2002–2007
In early 2002, Vollmer and Gray fell out after a recording session and the bassist left the band. He was replaced by Stan Miczek, also formerly of Harem Scarem, before all but Gamble were dismissed in the summer as the band relocated to London; the new lineup included guitarists Shawn Sanders and Dan Fawcett, and bassist Jeff "Stan" Fountain. Before the new incarnation could record anything, however, Vollmer fired Fawcett in early 2004 and Sanders chose to leave. In May the group released Rockin' in My Outer Space, which featured Rainer "Rhino" (lead guitar, keyboards) and Cindy Weichmann (backing vocals, guitar, percussion, keyboards); both musicians became official members of the band, and after the album's recording Jim Lawson was brought in on second lead guitar.

On July 17, 2004, Helix marked its 30th anniversary with a special concert featuring a wide range of former band members, which was released as 30th Anniversary Concert. Included were original members Ron Watson, Keith Zurbrigg, Bruce Arnold and Don Simmons, alongside numerous other performers. The next February, it was announced that Gamble had left the band after nearly ten years to focus on his other group Popjoy, with Brian Doerner returning in his place. The following spring, Vollmer decided to part with the Weichmanns and brought in Rick VanDyk as a new guitarist. At the same time, Doerner departed again and was replaced by Brent "Ned" Niemi. In March 2007, Fountain was replaced on bass by Paul Fonseca, a bandmate of both VanDyk and Niemi.

Since 2007
Helix released The Power of Rock and Roll in 2007, although none of the current members besides Vollmer performed on the album. This was followed the next year by A Heavy Mental Christmas, which featured all but Lawson. In February 2009, it was announced that Crash Kelly's Sean Kelly had replaced Fonseca on bass. The following month, Helix also revealed that Brent Doerner had replaced VanDyk for a third tenure in the band, while Rob MacEachern (who played drums on several recent Helix releases) had taken over from Niemi. By August that year, a reunion of the 'classic' 1984–1989 lineup of Vollmer, Doerner, Daryl Gray and Greg Hinz had been announced for a tour starting in October; later, Kaleb "Duckman" Duck was announced as the group's second guitarist.

In June 2012, Helix announced that Brent Doerner would be leaving the band for a third time in September. He was replaced by John Claus. By February 2014, Claus had been replaced by Chris Julke, who recorded the band's next album Bastard of the Blues. This was followed in 2019 by Old School, before Duck left in November that year and was replaced briefly by former guitarist Mark Chichkan and then by Gary Borden.

Members

Current

Former

Timeline

Lineups

References

External links
Helix official website

Helix